California Proposition 59 refers to one of the following

 California Proposition 59 (2004), an amendment of the Constitution of California that introduced freedom of information or "sunshine" provisions
 California Proposition 59 (2016), an advisory question on the California general election ballot regarding overturning the Citizens United court decision